Basketball at the Summer Olympics has been a sport for men consistently since 1936. 
Prior to its inclusion as a medal sport, basketball was held as a demonstration event in 1904. Women's basketball made its debut in the Summer Olympics in 1976. FIBA organizes both the men's and women's FIBA World Olympic Qualifying Tournaments and the Summer Olympics basketball tournaments, which are sanctioned by the IOC.

The United States is by far the most successful country in Olympic basketball, with United States men's teams having won 16 of 19 tournaments in which they participated, including seven consecutive titles from 1936 through 1968. United States women's teams have won 8 titles out of the 10 tournaments in which they competed, including seven in a row from 1996 to 2020. Besides the United States, Argentina is the only nation still in existence who has won either the men's or women's tournament. The Soviet Union, Yugoslavia and the Unified Team are the countries no longer in existence who have won the tournament. The United States are the defending champions in both men's and women's tournaments.

On 9 June 2017, the Executive Board of the International Olympic Committee announced that 3x3 basketball would become an official Olympic sport as of the 2020 Summer Olympics in Tokyo, Japan, for both men and women.

History
Basketball was invented by James Naismith in Springfield, Massachusetts, in 1891. Within a few decades, the new game became popular throughout the United States as an indoor sport. The popularity spread overseas and the International Basketball Federation (FIBA) was organized in 1932 in Geneva, Switzerland. The Young Men's Christian Association (YMCA) had a big part in the spread of this sport to many countries, and as many as 21 teams competed in the first Olympic basketball tournament.

American dominance
Thanks in part to the effort of Phog Allen—a Kansas Jayhawks collegiate coach—the first Olympic basketball tournament was organized in the 1936 Berlin Olympics on outdoor tennis courts. Dr. Naismith presented the medals to the top three teams. According to the Olympic rules of that time, all of the competitors were amateurs. The tournament was held indoors for the first time in 1948. The American team proved its dominance, winning the first seven Olympic tournaments through 1968, without losing a single game. While the Americans were barred from sending a team that contained players from the professional National Basketball Association, they instead sent in college players; teams from some other countries sent in their best players, as some of their players were classified as "amateur" by FIBA, by earning allowances instead of wages.

Munich and after
The U.S. winning streak ended in 1972 in one of the most controversial matches in history, when the Soviet Union beat them in the gold-medal game by one point.

The U.S. team reclaimed the gold medal in 1976, with Yugoslavia, which had beaten the Soviet Union in the semifinal, finishing runner-up for the second time. In 1980, with the Americans' absence due to the boycott, Yugoslavia became the third team to win the title, after beating the Soviets anew in the semifinals and Italy in the final. The Americans regained the title in 1984, by beating Spain in the final, with the Soviets boycotting this time. The Soviets won the gold medal for the second time in 1988, after beating the U.S. team for the second time in the semifinal, and the Yugoslavs in the gold medal game.

Professional era: renewed American dominance
The advent of the state-sponsored "full-time amateur athlete" of the Eastern Bloc countries eroded the ideology of the pure amateur, as it put the self-financed amateurs of the Western countries at a disadvantage. The Soviet Union entered teams of athletes who were all nominally listed in the military, but all of whom were in fact paid by the state to train full-time. In April 1989, through the leadership of Secretary General Borislav Stanković, FIBA approved the rule that allowed NBA players to compete in international tournaments, including the Olympics. In the 1992 Summer Olympics, the U.S. "Dream Team" won the gold medal with an average winning margin of 44 points per game, and without calling a timeout. By this time, the Soviet Union and Yugoslavia no longer existed, but their successor states continued to be among the leading forces. Two newly independent countries of the former Yugoslavia and Soviet Union, Croatia and Lithuania, won the silver and bronze medals respectively.

The American team repeated its victory in 1996 and 2000, but its performance was not as dominant as in 1992. Since active NBA players have been allowed to compete in the Summer Olympics, the 1996 Games in Atlanta is the only instance where the Olympic host city also had a home NBA team — the Hawks. Yugoslavia was the runner-up in Atlanta, and France in Sydney, with Lithuania winning bronze again on both occasions.

The renewed dominance of the U.S. was interrupted in 2004, when the Americans barely made it to the semifinal, after losing to Puerto Rico and Lithuania in the preliminaries; Argentina defeated them in the semifinals, on their way to a gold medal finish, where they beat Italy in the final, and became the fourth team to win the Olympic title.

The Americans regrouped in 2008, beating the reigning FIBA world champions, Spain, in an intense gold medal game, with the Argentines beating the Lithuanians in the bronze medal game. The Americans and the Spaniards met again in the 2012 gold medal game, with the U.S. again winning, although with the closest winning margin for the American team. The U.S. won again in 2016, defeating the Serbians in the gold medal game, a rematch of the 2014 FIBA Basketball World Cup Final, after eliminating the Spaniards, who settled for bronze.

Women
The first women's tournament was staged in the 1976 Summer Olympics. The Soviet Union won five straight games, becoming the inaugural champion. The next two tournaments followed the six-team round-robin format, with the Soviets defending their title in 1980 amid the U.S.-led boycott, and the U.S. winning in 1984, against the South Koreans, amid the Soviet-led boycott. In 1988, the tournament expanded into eight teams, with the Americans beating Yugoslavia in the gold medal game. In 1992, the Unified Team, consisting of the former Soviet republics, defeated China in the gold medal game. In 1996, the tournament settled into its current 12-team format; the U.S. has swept all of the tournaments since then, winning 48 consecutive games.

Venues

All venues were indoor stadiums except for the 1936 tournament which was held outdoors on lawn tennis courts.

 Berlin 1936: Reichssportfeld, Berlin
 London 1948: Harringay Arena, London
 Helsinki 1952: Tennis Palace and Messuhalli II, both in Helsinki
 Melbourne 1956: Royal Exhibition Building, Melbourne
 Rome 1960: Sports Arena and Sports Palace, Rome
 Tokyo 1964: Yoyogi National Gymnasium, Tokyo
 Mexico City 1968: Palacio de los Deportes, Mexico City
 Munich 1972: Basketballhalle, Munich
 Montreal 1976: Étienne Desmarteau Centre and the  Montreal Forum, Montreal
 Moscow 1980: CSCA Sports Palace and Olimpiysky Stadium, Moscow
 Los Angeles 1984: The Forum, Inglewood
 Seoul 1988: Jamsil Arena, Seoul
 Barcelona 1992: Pavelló Olímpic de Badalona, Badalona
 Atlanta 1996: Forbes Arena and the Georgia Dome, Atlanta
 Sydney 2000: The Dome and Sydney SuperDome, Parramatta
 Athens 2004: Hellinikon Indoor Arena and the Olympic Indoor Hall, Elliniko and Marousi 
 Beijing 2008: Wukesong Indoor Stadium, Beijing
 London 2012: Olympic Basketball Arena and The O2 Arena, London
 Rio de Janeiro 2016: Carioca Arena 1 and Youth Arena, Rio de Janeiro
 Tokyo  2020: Saitama Super Arena, Saitama
 Paris 2024: Accor Arena, Paris
 Los Angeles 2028: Crypto.com Arena, Los Angeles
 Brisbane 2032: Brisbane Indoor Sports Centre, Brisbane

Qualifying
As of 2012, the qualifying process consists of three stages:
1 team (for each gender) qualifies as the reigning world champion.
7 teams for men and 5 for women qualify through their respective regional championships.
3 teams for men and 5 for women qualify through a world qualifying tournament, in which the best teams which did not qualify directly from each zone compete for the remaining berths.

Additionally, the teams of the host nation qualify automatically.

In 2020, the men's tournament will have a new qualification system. After the 2019 FIBA World Cup, seven teams will qualify directly: the top two European and American teams, and the top team from Africa, Asia and Oceania. The next 16 best teams from the FIBA World Cup will join the two teams from each continent at the Olympic qualifiers. It will feature four groups of six teams, where the best team of each group will get the remaining spots at the Olympics. The continental championships will no longer be used for Olympic qualifying.

Men's tournaments

Performance by confederation
This is a summary of the best performances of each confederation in each tournament.

Participating nations

Notes
 NOC was not member of IOC
 as  China from 1936–56
 part of  Yugoslavia from 1936–1988
 part of 
 as  West Germany from 1968–88
 part of  Malaysia in 1964
 Soviet Union chose not to compete in 1936 and 1948
 part of  Czechoslovakia from 1920–92

Women's tournaments

Performance by confederation
This is a summary of the best performances of each confederation in each tournament.

Participating nations

Notes
 NOC was not member of IOC
 competed as part of  Soviet Union from 1952–88
 part of  Czechoslovakia from 1920–92
 as  Zaire from 1984–96
 part of "Yugoslavia" from 1976–2000 and "Serbia and Montenegro" in 2004

Medal table
Sources:

Total

 Soviet Union (as of 1992) and Yugoslavia (as of 2006) are defunct. No team carried over the records of these nations.
 Yugoslavia has been the designation from two distinct national entities: Socialist Federal Republic of Yugoslavia from 1948 to 1988 formed as a joint state of 6 republics; Federal Republic of Yugoslavia from 1996 to 2006 formed as a joint state by only Montenegro and Serbia. In 2003, Federal Republic of Yugoslavia was renamed to Serbia and Montenegro, however both Federal Republic of Yugoslavia and Serbia and Montenegro represented the same national entity: a joint state of Montenegro and Serbia.

Medal table (men)

 Soviet Union (as of 1992) and Yugoslavia (as of 2006) are defunct. No team carried over the records of these nations.
 Yugoslavia has been the designation from two distinct national entities: Socialist Federal Republic of Yugoslavia from 1948 to 1988 formed as a joint state of 6 republics; Federal Republic of Yugoslavia from 1996 to 2006 formed as a joint state by only Montenegro and Serbia. In 2003, Federal Republic of Yugoslavia was renamed to Serbia and Montenegro, however both Federal Republic of Yugoslavia and Serbia and Montenegro represented the same national entity: a joint state of Montenegro and Serbia.

Medal table (women)

 Soviet Union (as of 1992) and Yugoslavia (as of 2006) are defunct. No team carried over the records of these nations.
 Yugoslavia has been the designation from two distinct national entities: Socialist Federal Republic of Yugoslavia from 1948 to 1988 formed as a joint state of 6 republics; Federal Republic of Yugoslavia from 1996 to 2006 formed as a joint state by only Montenegro and Serbia.

Win–loss records

Men's tournament

As of 8 August 2021

Women's tournament

As of 8 August 2021

Records

As of 1 May 2018.

Top career scorers
The International Olympic Committee does not recognize records for basketball, although FIBA does.

Men

As of 8 August 2021

Women

Top scorer per tournament

See also
 3x3 basketball at the Summer Olympics
 Basketball at the Asian Games
 Basketball at the African Games
 Basketball at the Commonwealth Games
 Basketball at the Youth Olympic Games
 Basketball at the Pacific Games
 Basketball at the Pan American Games
Wheelchair basketball at the Summer Paralympics

Notes

References
2012 London Olympic Basketball Tournament Coverage by fiba.com
Olympic Basketball Medal count by fiba.com
All-time men's results
All-time women's results

 
Olympics
Sports at the Summer Olympics